Nagi Jamal Omar (born 16 December 1986), better known as simply Nano, is a Swedish singer and songwriter. He first came to prominence while competing in Melodifestivalen 2017.

Life and career

Early life and personal life
Omar was born on 16 December 1986 in Tumba, Botkyrka, Stockholm. His father is Palestinian, while his mother is from Åland. At age 12, he moved to a foster home in Gotland. When his mother visited him for the first time since moving in, she gave him a synthesizer, which influenced his decision to focus on music.

He was arrested at age 18, and went to jail. When he was 21, he ended up in jail once again and thereafter was also informed that his girlfriend was pregnant with their child; Because of this, he decided to focus on his family and resume his musical career. He currently lives with his partner and four children in Södertälje.

2015–present: Career breakthrough and Melodifestivalen 2017
In the spring of 2015, he released his debut single "Lion". In 2017, he began competing in Melodifestivalen 2017, the Swedish national selection for the Eurovision Song Contest 2017 with the song "Hold On". He progressed directly to the final from the first-semi-final. In the final he placed second overall, being the winner of the televoting and second in the jury voting.

He participated in Melodifestivalen 2019 with the song "Chasing Rivers".

Discography

Singles

References

External links 
 

1986 births
Living people
People from Tumba, Sweden
People from Gotland
Swedish pop singers
English-language singers from Sweden
Swedish people of Palestinian descent
Swedish people of Finnish descent
21st-century Swedish singers
21st-century Swedish male singers
Melodifestivalen contestants of 2019
Melodifestivalen contestants of 2017